Friars' Crag, sometimes spelled Friar's Crag or Friars Crag, is a promontory overlooking Derwentwater near Keswick, Cumbria, in the English Lake District. It is a popular site with visitors and was acquired for the public by the National Trust in the 1920s.

As well as its natural beauty, Friars' Crag is known for its literary and artistic associations with, among others, Robert Southey, J. M. W. Turner, John Ruskin and Arthur Ransome

Background and description

The 7th-century priest and hermit Saint Herbert lived on an island in Derwentwater. Friars' Crag derives its name from its use as an embarkment point by monks making a pilgrimage to the island. Both Friars' Crag and St Herbert's Island are now owned by the National Trust. The crag is at the end of a promontory about half a mile south of the modern boat landing-stages at Keswick, and is reached by a footpath along the eastern side of the lake.

Friars' Crag has been valued as a beauty spot since at least the 18th century. The poet Robert Southey said of it, "If I had Aladdin's lamp, or Fortunatus's purse, I would here build myself a house". J. M. W. Turner painted the view from the crag in either the late 18th or early 19th century. The art critic and social reformer John Ruskin wrote of the spot:

Ruskin, a pioneer of the protection of the unspoiled beauty of the Lake District, said that the view from Friars' Crag "is one of the three or four most beautiful in Europe". In October 1900, nine months after his death, a monument to Ruskin was unveiled at the side of the path to Friars' Crag. The driving force behind the erection of the Ruskin memorial was Hardwicke Rawnsley, one of the three founders of the National Trust. He died in 1920, and in his memory the trust raised money to buy Friars' Crag and the surrounding land. A memorial to him was installed in 1922.

The children's author Arthur Ransome incorporated Friars' Crag into his Swallows and Amazons (1930), where it is given the name "Darien", the look-out point for the young crew of the Swallow.

Notes

Sources